Mount Haffner (or Haffner Bjerg) is a  m high mountain in north-west Greenland. It is located on the Hayes Peninsula.

References 

Mountains of Greenland
One-thousanders of Greenland